"Soon" is a song written by Bob Regan and Casey Kelly, and recorded by American country music artist Tanya Tucker.  It was released in October 1993 as the first single and title track from the album Soon.  The song reached #2 on the Billboard Hot Country Singles & Tracks chart, behind Doug Supernaw's "I Don't Call Him Daddy".

Content
"Soon" is composed in the key of A major. Its verses follow the chord pattern Fm-Fdim-A/E-D-G9-F-B-Bm7-Esus4-E, while the chorus follows the pattern A-D-A-E/G-Fm-B7sus4-B-Bm7-E-A and the bridge is Cm-D-A-Bm twice. The song follows a woman who has an affair with a married man, who tells her that he will "soon" be available for her; at the end, the woman realizes that the man has not ended his existing relationship. During a songwriting session, Bob Regan met Casey Kelly for the first time when Kelly presented a lyric that he had first written in the 1980s: "Christmas finds her all alone with no cause to rejoice / So she calls his Code-a-Phone just to hear his voice", as well as the song's general concept and title. The two also decided on a "lyrically different chorus to go with each additional verse". After completing the song, immediately decided to pitch it to Tanya Tucker, whom they thought would "take a chance" on the song's unusual material.

Chart performance

References

1994 singles
1993 songs
Tanya Tucker songs
Songs written by Casey Kelly (songwriter)
Songs written by Bob Regan
Liberty Records singles
Song recordings produced by Jerry Crutchfield